7/3 may refer to:
July 3 (month-day date notation)
March 7 (day-month date notation)
A type of heptagram